Pamela Alfred (born  28 September 1978) is a Saint Lucian former cricketer who played as a right-handed batter and right-arm medium bowler. She appeared in four One Day Internationals for the West Indies in 2003, all against Sri Lanka. She played domestic cricket for Saint Lucia.

References

External links
 
 

1978 births
Living people
Saint Lucian women cricketers
West Indies women One Day International cricketers
West Indian women cricketers